Galinsoga caligensis is a Peruvian species of flowering plant in the family Asteraceae. It has been found in the coastal desert regions of west-central Peru, in the Lima Region.

Description
Each head has 4-8 white ray flowers surrounding 35-75 yellow disc flowers.

References

caligensis
Flora of Peru
Plants described in 1977